Isle Tower also known as Lochar Tower and Bankend Tower is a 16th-century ruined tower house located in the north of Bankend in Dumfries and Galloway, Scotland. It was a property of the Maxwell family.

History
The building is mentioned in a 1560s English report and was built around 1565 at which time William Maxwell was resident. Lord Scrope burned the tower in 1570. William's successor Edward Maxwell of Isle reconstructed the building in 1622, with a stair wing being added to its north east side. It appears to have been abandoned soon after the death of Robert Maxwell, 2nd Earl of Nithsdale in 1667.  Most of the south east end of the tower had collapsed by the end of the 19th century and the stair wing fell in 1969.

References

Tower houses in Scotland
Castles in Dumfries and Galloway
Category B listed buildings in Dumfries and Galloway
Listed castles in Scotland